Artery Recordings is an American record label based in Sacramento, California founded in 2010 as an imprint of Razor & Tie by Eric Rushing, owner of The Artery Foundation.

On August 31, 2017, it was announced that Artery was acquired by Warner Music Group.

Former artists

 A Bullet for Pretty Boy (disbanded)
 Adestria (disbanded)
 Aethere (inactive)
 Afterlife (active, Hopeless Records)
 Altered Perceptions (inactive)
 American Standards (active)
 Attila (active, unsigned)
 Austrian Death Machine (active)
 BackWordz (active, unsigned)
 Bloodline (active, unsigned)
 Bodysnatcher (active, E One Music)
 Broken Youth (active, unsigned)
 Built On Secrets (disbanded)
 Buried In Verona (disbanded)
 Bury Tomorrow (active, Music For Nations Records)
 Bury Your Dead (active)
 Capture (formerly known as Capture the Crown, inactive)
 Carcer City (disbanded)
 Casino Madrid (disbanded)
 Chelsea Grin (active, unsigned)
 Climates (disbanded)
 Close to Home (disbanded)
 Cold Black (hiatus)
 Concepts (active)
 Conquer Divide (active)
 The Crimson Armada (disbanded)
 Crystal Lake (active, SharpTone Records)
 Deadships (active, unsigned)
 Dead Silence Hides My Cries (inactive)
 Dealer (active, Human Warfare)
 Distinguisher (active, unsigned)
 Dreamshade (unsigned)
 Dropout Kings (active, Suburban Noize Records)
 Early Seasons (disbanded)
 Empire (disbanded)
 Entheos (active, Spinefarm Records)
 Extortionist (active, unsigned)
 Falsifier (unsigned)
For the Fallen Dreams (active, Arising Empire)
 For The Win (disbanded)
 Four Letter Lie (inactive)
 Gamma Sector (active, unsigned)
 Guillotines (active, unsigned)
 Heartaches (inactive)
 I Declare War (unsigned)
 Impulse
 In Dying Arms (active, unsigned)
 Incredible' Me (disbanded)
 Insvrgence (active, unsigned)
 Invisons (active, Lowlife Music)
 It Lives, It Breathes (active, unsigned)
 It Prevails (active, unsigned)
 Iwrestledabearonce (disbanded)
 Kissing Candice (active, independent)
 Kriminals (inactive)
 Kublai Khan (active, Rise Records)
 Meltdown (disbanded)
 Message to the Masses (active, unsigned)
 Mothersound (active, unsigned)
 Myka Relocate (disbanded)
 Notions (active, Phantom Gang)
 Old Again (disbanded)
 Old Lung (active, unsigned)
 On Broken Wings (active, unsigned)
 Pugtopsy (inactive)
 Redeem/Revive (active, unsigned)
 Scars of Tomorrow (inactive)
 Sentinels (active, Sharptone Records)
 Set On End (inactive) 
 Shamecult (inactive)
 Shoot the Girl First (inactive)
 Siamese (active, Long Branch Records)
 Silent Screams (active, Long Branch Records)
 Sirens & Sailors (active, unsigned)
 Slaves (Now "Rain City Drive") (active, Thriller Records)
 Sleeptalk (active, unsigned)
 Sleep Waker (disbanded)
 Spite (active, Rise Records)
 Spoken (active, unsigned)
 Steve Terreberry
 The Ansible (active, unsigned)
 Unlocking the Truth (disbanded)
Upon This Dawning (disbanded)
 Vanna (disbanded)
Vesta Collide (disbanded)
 Villain of the Story (active, Out of Line Music)
 We Are The Flesh (active, unsigned)
 Weeping Wound (active, unsigned)
 White Fox Society (disbanded)
 Wildways (active, Warner Music Russia)
 Years Since The Storm (disbanded)

See also
 List of record labels

References

External links

 
American record labels
Hardcore record labels
Heavy metal record labels